Murray Melville is a Scottish curler.

At the 1969 World Men's Championship, called the Air Canada Silver Broom, Bill Muirhead brought Melville in to replace second Derek Scott, who had a migraine, for the semifinal against the United States. Scotland lost that game, settling for the bronze medal.

In 1970, Muirhead brought Melville on to his team full-time, replacing Alex Young at lead. The other two members of Muirhead's bronze medalist team, second Derek Scott and third George Haggart, stayed on in their respective positions. Melville and Team Muirhead won the Scottish men's champion that year, taking them back to the World Championship. At World's they won the silver medal when they lost to Don Duguid's Team Canada in the final with a score of 4–11.

In 1983, Melville played third for Alan Glen's team when they won the Perth Masters, a major bonspiel held annually in Perth, Scotland.

Teams

References

External links
 

Scottish male curlers
Living people
Scottish curling champions
Year of birth missing (living people)